Vivario is a commune in the Haute-Corse department of France on the island of Corsica at the start of the climb to the Col de Vizzavona.

Population

Transport 

The town is served by a station on the Corsican Railways.

See also 
 Communes of the Haute-Corse department

References

Communes of Haute-Corse